The 1961 Dartmouth Indians football team was an American football team that represented Dartmouth College during the 1961 NCAA University Division football season. Dartmouth tied for third in the Ivy League.

In their seventh season under head coach Bob Blackman, the Indians compiled a 6–3 record and outscored opponents 197 to 104. James Lemen was the team captain.

The Indians' 5–2 conference record tied for third-best in the Ivy League standings. They outscored Ivy opponents 156 to 84. 

Dartmouth played its home games at Memorial Field on the college campus in Hanover, New Hampshire.

Schedule

References

Dartmouth
Dartmouth Big Green football seasons
Dartmouth Indians football